Wattle Camp is a rural locality in the South Burnett Region, Queensland, Australia. In the  Wattle Camp had a population of 517 people.

Geography 
The Wondai State Forest is in the west of the locality.

There is a rural residential area in the north and east of the locality. Apart from these, the predominant land use is grazing on native vegetation.

History 
In the  Wattle Camp had a population of 517 people.

References 

South Burnett Region
Localities in Queensland